In mathematics, Salomon Bochner proved in 1946 that any Killing vector field of a compact Riemannian manifold with negative Ricci curvature must be zero. Consequently the isometry group of the manifold must be finite.

Discussion 
The theorem is a corollary of Bochner's more fundamental result which says that on any connected Riemannian manifold of negative Ricci curvature, the length of a nonzero Killing vector field cannot have a local maximum. In particular, on a closed Riemannian manifold of negative Ricci curvature, every Killing vector field is identically zero. Since the isometry group of a complete Riemannian manifold is a Lie group whose Lie algebra is naturally identified with the vector space of Killing vector fields, it follows that the isometry group is zero-dimensional. Bochner's theorem then follows from the fact that the isometry group of a closed Riemannian manifold is compact.

Bochner's result on Killing vector fields is an application of the maximum principle as follows. As an application of the Ricci commutation identities, the formula

holds for any vector field  on a pseudo-Riemannian manifold. As a consequence, there is

In the case that  is a Killing vector field, this simplifies to

However, on a Riemannian metric of negative Ricci curvature, the right-hand side is strictly positive wherever  is nonzero. So if  has a local maximum, then it must be identically zero in a neighborhood. Since Killing vector fields on connected manifolds are uniquely determined from their value and derivative at a single point, it follows that  must be identically zero.

Notes

References 

 

 

 

Theorems in differential geometry